XHIW-FM is a radio station on 101.3 FM in Uruapan, Michoacán, Mexico.

History
XEIW-AM 1160 received its concession on October 15, 1964. The station was owned by Vita López de Flores and operated as a daytimer with 1,000 watts. The Flores and López families transferred the concession to a group named for them — Grupo Radio FyL — in 2006. It migrated to FM in 2011.

References

Radio stations in Michoacán